The 1931 New Zealand general election was a nationwide vote to determine the shape of the New Zealand Parliament's 24th term. It resulted in the newly formed coalition between the United Party and the Reform Party remaining in office as the United–Reform Coalition Government, although the opposition Labour Party made some minor gains despite tallying more votes than any other single party.

Background
In the 1928 election, the Reform Party won 28 seats to the United Party's 27 seats. Shortly after the election the Reform Party lost a vote of no-confidence and the United Party managed to form a government, the United Government, with the support of the Labour Party, with governing Reform Party going into the opposition. In 1931, however, the agreement between United and Labour collapsed due to differing opinions on how to counter the Great Depression. The Reform Party, fearing that the Depression would give Labour a substantial boost, reluctantly agreed to form a coalition with United to avert elections. By forming a coalition, United and Reform were able to blunt Labour's advantage, ending the possibility of the anti-Labour vote being split.

The election
The date for the main 1931 elections was 2 December, a Wednesday. Elections to the four Māori electorates were held the day before. 874,787 people were registered to vote, and there was a turnout of 83.3%. This turnout was below average for the time period.

The number of seats was 80, a number which had been fixed since 1902. However, in four electorates (Bay of Plenty, Oroua, Pahiatua) there was only one candidate.

Results

The 1931 election saw the recently formed governing coalition retain office as the United–Reform Coalition, winning fifty-one seats, including four independents. This was a drop of four seats from what the two parties had won in the previous elections, but was still considerably better than many had expected given the economic situation. The Labour Party won twenty-four seats, a gain of five. In the popular vote (including pro-coalition independents), the coalition won 54.0% of the vote, down from the 66.1% that the two parties had won previously. Labour won 34.3%. The only other party to gain a place in Parliament was the Country Party, which won a single seat. Four other independents were elected.

Party totals

Votes summary

The following table shows the detailed results:

Key

|-
 |colspan=8 style="background-color:#FFDEAD" | General electorates
|-

|-
 | Hauraki
 | style="background-color:;" |
 | colspan=3 style="text-align:center;background-color:;" | Walter William Massey
 | style="text-align:right;" | 2,750
 | style="background-color:;" |
 | style="text-align:center;" | Charles Robert Petrie
|-

|-
 |colspan=8 style="background-color:#FFDEAD" | Māori electorates
|-

|}

Table footnotes:

 Four of the eight independent MPs (Connolly, Hargest, McSkimming, and Polson) were aligned with the United–Reform Coalition, and are not classified as independents by some sources.

Notes

References